From the Cradle to the Grave, released in 1983, is the second album by the anarcho-punk band "Subhumans".

Track listing
 "[Untitled Track]" – 0:44 (The original title on the cover and label is a pair of musical notes, apparently intended to indicate that the track is an instrumental.)
 "Forget" – 1:20
 "Waste of Breath" – 1:58
 "Where’s the Freedom?" – 3:25
 "Reality Is Waiting for a Bus" – 2:14
 "Us Fish Must Swim Together" – 3:29 (The original title on the cover and label is a simple abstract drawing of a fish, similar to an ichthys.)
 "Wake Up Screaming" – 5:22
 "Adversity" – 2:41
 "Rain" – 3:13
 "From the Cradle to the Grave" - 16:53

Personnel
Dick Lucas – vocals
Bruce – guitar/vocals, bass on track 10
Trotsky – drums
Phil – bass

References

1983 albums
Subhumans (British band) albums